Gerdakaneh, also rendered as Gerda Kaneh or Gerdeh Kaneh or Gerdeh Kani or Gerdkani or Girdehkani, may refer to:

Gerdakaneh, Kermanshah
Gerdakaneh-ye Olya, Kermanshah Province
Gerdakaneh-ye Sofla, Kermanshah Province
Gerdakaneh, Lorestan
Gerdakaneh Sanjabi